Kornelia Polyak is a professor of medicine at Harvard Medical School and an internationally recognized breast cancer expert.

Polyak earned her MD from Albert Szent-Gyorgyi Medical University in Szeged, Hungary, and her PhD from Weill Cornell Graduate School of Medical Sciences/Sloan-Kettering Cancer Center in New York City. She then did a fellowship in cancer genetics at Johns Hopkins Oncology Center with Bert Vogelstein and Kenneth Kinzler.

In 1998, Polyak joined the faculty of Dana–Farber Cancer Institute. Her research focuses on breast tumor evolution. Her research is funded in part by the Breast Cancer Research Foundation.

From 2010 to 2013, she served on the American Association for Cancer Research Board of Directors, and from 2015 to 2019, she was a member of the AACR Women in Cancer Research council.

Awards 
 2007 AACR 27th Annual Award for Outstanding Achievement in Cancer Research
 2008 Elected member of the American Society for Clinical Investigation
 2011 Paul Marks Prize for Cancer Research
 2012 AACR Outstanding Investigator Award for Breast Cancer Research
 2015 Outstanding Investigator Award, National Cancer Institute
 2016 Rosalind Franklin Award
 2019 AAAS Fellow
 2020 Fellows of the AACR Academy
 2020 Distinguished Alumna Award, Weill Cornell Graduate School of Medical Sciences
 2022 National Academy of Sciences
 2022 National Academy of Medicine
 2022 American Cancer Society Research Professor

References 

Harvard Medical School faculty
Year of birth missing (living people)
Living people